Lockport is an unincorporated community in Adams Township, Carroll County, Indiana. It is part of the Lafayette, Indiana Metropolitan Statistical Area.

History
A post office was established at Lockport in 1838, and remained in operation until it was discontinued in 1904. The birth of the town, and its name, are related to the set of lock gates that one would have encountered on the Wabash and Erie Canal.

Geography
Burnetts Creek flows along the east side of town.

References

External links

Unincorporated communities in Carroll County, Indiana
Unincorporated communities in Indiana
Lafayette metropolitan area, Indiana